Jambuda is a small village in Jamnagar district, which is a part of the Indian state of Gujarat. The major population includes shadhu, Gadhavi, Rajgor Brahmin, Patels, Rajputs (Kshatriya), shepherd, Charaniya and Kori communities. The village is situated on the way to the only Sainik School of Gujarat, "Sainik School Balachadi".

Places to visit near Jambuda
 Sainik School Balachadi, Balachadi Beach (13 km)
 Sachana Ship Breaking Yard (5 km)
 Ranuja Ramdevpir Temple (4 km)
 Khijadiya Bird sanctuary (5 km)
 Jamnagar or Nawanagar (16 km)
 Jamnagar-Rajkot Highway(1.5 km)

References 

Villages in Jamnagar district

Charan